The British National Formulary (BNF) is a United Kingdom (UK) pharmaceutical reference book that contains a wide spectrum of information and advice on prescribing and pharmacology, along with specific facts and details about many medicines available on the UK National Health Service (NHS).  Information within the BNF includes indication(s), contraindications, side effects, doses, legal classification, names and prices of available proprietary and generic formulations, and any other notable points.  Though it is a national formulary, it nevertheless also includes entries for some medicines which are not available under the NHS, and must be prescribed and/or purchased privately.  A symbol clearly denotes such drugs in their entry.

It is used by pharmacists and doctors (both general practitioners (GPs) and generalist hospital practitioners, and by other prescribing healthcare professionals (such as nurses, pharmacy technicians, paramedics, and dentists); as a reference for correct dosage, indication, interactions and side effects of drugs.  It is also used as a reassurance by those administering drugs, for example a nurse on a hospital ward, and even for patients and others seeking an authoritative source of advice on any aspect of pharmacotherapy.

Development
Many individuals and organisations contribute towards the preparation of the BNF.  It is authored by Pharmaceutical Press, the Royal Pharmaceutical Society's (RPS) knowledge business; and is jointly published by the BMJ (owned by the BMA), and Pharmaceutical Press (owned by the RPS). It is published under the authority of a Joint Formulary Committee (JFC), which comprises pharmacy, medical, nursing, and lay representatives; there are also representatives from the Medicines and Healthcare products Regulatory Agency (MHRA), the UK Health Departments, and a national guideline producer. 

Information on drugs is drawn from the manufacturers' product literature, medical and pharmaceutical literature, regulatory authorities and professional bodies.  Advice is constructed from clinical literature, and reflects, as far as possible, an evaluation of the evidence from diverse sources.  The BNF also takes account of authoritative national guidelines and emerging safety concerns.  In addition, the Joint Formulary Committee takes advice on all therapeutic areas from advisers from expert groups; this ensures that the BNF's recommendations are relevant to practice.  In September 2016, the National Institute for Health and Care Excellence (NICE) in the UK gave NICE accreditation to the processes to produce BNF publications; a further review in 2021 resulted in the successful renewal of accreditation.

History
It was first published in 1949 as the National Formulary, with updated versions appearing every three years until 1976.  The fifth version in 1957 saw its name change to The British National Formulary.  A new-look version, under the auspices of Owen Wade, was released in 1981.  A study in Northern Ireland, looking at prescribing in 1965, reported that the BNF was likely able to serve the requirements of prescribers in general practice, while also achieving a cost saving.  By 2003, issue 46 of the BNF contained 3000 interactions or groups of interactions, with about 900 of these marked by a bullet.

Editions
A new edition of the BNF book is published twice-yearly, in March and September.  The current edition is 84, which was published in September 2022.  It is a tradition that the colour of each new edition is radically different from the previous.

Availability
The BNF is presently available as a book, a website, and mobile applications - the latter for use on smartphones and tablets.  The book is available for purchase, and the September edition is distributed to healthcare professionals in the UK at no direct cost to them.  NHS workers and healthcare professionals in the HINARI group of developing nations are entitled to free access via MedicinesComplete following registration (requires provision of a name, an address, an email address, and a phone number).  Other visitors can subscribe to the BNF on MedicinesComplete.  Healthcare organisations can also subscribe to a customisable BNF via their corporate online intranet.  In 2017, BNF Publications released applications for offline access to the BNF on iOS and Android devices.  Monthly content updates are available, over an internet connection. NICE provides a website providing the content of the BNF to the public, including non-NHS users.

The BNF also includes the Nurse Prescribers' Formulary (NPF) and other NPF content for use by District Nurses and Specialist Community Public Health Nurses (including Health Visitors) who have received training to become nurse prescribers.

Sister publications
The British National Formulary for Children (BNFC) book, first published September 2005, is published yearly, and details the doses and uses of medicines in children from neonates to adolescents.

BNF sections
The British National Formulary is divided into various sections; with the main sections on drugs and preparations being organised by body system.

Table of Contents
Preface
Acknowledgements
How BNF publications are constructed
How to use the BNF
Changes
Guidance on prescribing
Prescription writing
Emergency supply of medicines
Controlled drugs and drug dependence
Adverse reactions to drugs
Guidance on intravenous infusions
Medicines optimisation 
Antimicrobial stewardship
Prescribing for children
Prescribing in hepatic impairment
Prescribing in renal impairment
Prescribing in pregnancy
Prescribing in breast-feeding
Prescribing in palliative care
Prescribing for the elderly
Drugs and sport
Prescribing in dental practice

Notes on drugs and preparations
 Gastro-intestinal system
 Cardiovascular system
 Respiratory system
 Nervous system
 Infection
 Endocrine system
 Genito-urinary system
 Malignant disease
 Blood and nutrition
 Musculoskeletal system
 Eye
 Ear, nose, and oropharynx
 Skin
 Vaccines
 Anaesthesia
 Emergency treatment of poisoning

Appendices and indices
Appendix 1 Interactions
Appendix 2 Borderline substances
Appendix 3 Cautionary and advisory labels for dispensed medicines
Appendix 4 Wound management products and elasticated garments
Dental Practitioners' Formulary
Nurse Prescribers' Formulary
Non-medical prescribing
Index of proprietary manufacturers
Special-order manufacturers

See also
Pharmacopeia
Specification (technical standard)
Irish Medicines Formulary

References

External links
 

Pharmacy in the United Kingdom
Professional associations based in the United Kingdom
Medical manuals
British books
Pharmacology literature